Leporinus is a genus of fish in the family Anostomidae native to South America. The fossil species Leporinus scalabrinii, known from the late Miocene of Entre Ríos in Argentina, has only recently been added to this genus after being misidentified as a species of primate under the name Arrhinolemur scalabrinii for over 100 years.

Species
There are currently 78 recognized species in this genus: 

† = extinct

Synonyms 
The following species were formerly placed in Leporinus but have since been moved to other genera:

 Hypomasticus copelandii was described as Leporinus copelandii 
 Hypomasticus steindachneri was described as Leporinus steindachneri C. H. Eigenmann, 1907

References

Anostomidae
Fish of South America
Freshwater fish genera
Taxa named by Louis Agassiz